Hooded Fang are a Canadian indie rock band, formed in Toronto, Ontario, Canada in 2007.

Band history
The band led by twin lyricists, bassist/vocalist April Aliermo and guitarist/vocalist Daniel Lee, formed in 2007, and named themselves after a sandwich sold in the Portuguese quarter of their native Toronto.

Hooded fang's debut recording EP was self-released on 15 September 2008. Their first full-length album, Album, was self-released on 6 August 2010, distributed by Outside Music. The album appeared on the !Earshot National Top 50 Chart in October. It was nominated for a Polaris Prize and drew comparisons to Thee Oh Sees, Black Lips, and Broken Social Scene. Both recordings were reviewed positively by Exclaim!.

The band released their debut UK album, Tosta Mista, in March 2012 on the UK independent record label, Full Time Hobby.

Their third album, Gravez was released in April 2013.

Band members
April Aliermo – bass guitar, lyricist (2007–present)
Julia Barnes – trombone, vocals (2007–?)
Daniel Lee – lyricist, lead vocals, drums, guitar (2007–present)
Lane Halley – lead guitar, trumpet (2007–present)
Nicholas Hune-Brown – keyboard, (2007–2011)
D. Alex Meeks – drums (2010–present)
Lorna Wright – lead vocals, guitar, glockenspiel (2007–2011)

Discography

EPs

Albums

See also

List of bands from Canada

References

Musical groups established in 2007
Musical groups from Toronto
Canadian indie rock groups
2007 establishments in Ontario